The Hotel International in Brno, is one of the most important and best preserved buildings in the Brussels style in the Czech Republic.  The eleven-story hotel was built between 1959 - 1962 designed by Ernest Krejza and Milos Kramoliše. The building is inspired by the style of Brazilian architect Oscar Niemeyer, There are also features of late functionalism. The hotel was opened on June 29, 1962. From its inception to 24 December 2013, the building was a cultural monument. 
The hotel was operated from 1962 to 1989 by the state company Inter Brno,. At the time of opening of the hotel had 301 rooms with a capacity of 697 people. It had about 300 employees.  After the Velvet Revolution in 1989, the hotel was privatized and ownership passed to Hotel International Brno, Inc., founded in 1992.

References

External links 
 Official pages 
 Architecture information - in Czech
 Historical page for former Interhotel Brno - in Czech

Hotels in the Czech Republic
1962 establishments in Czechoslovakia
Hotels established in 1962
Hotel buildings completed in 1962
Buildings and structures in Brno
20th-century architecture in the Czech Republic